The magnate term, from the late Latin magnas, a great man, itself from Latin magnus, "great", means a man from the  higher nobility, a man who belongs to the high office-holders, or a man in a high social position, by birth, wealth or other qualities in Western Christian countries since the medieval period. It also includes the members of the higher clergy, such as bishops, archbishops and cardinals. In reference to the medieval, the term is often used to distinguish higher territorial landowners and warlords, such as counts, earls, dukes, and territorial-princes from the baronage, and in Poland for the richest szlachta.

England
In England, the magnate class went through a change in the later Middle Ages. It had previously consisted of all tenants-in-chief of the crown, a group of more than a hundred families. The emergence of Parliament led to the establishment of a parliamentary peerage that received personal summons, rarely more than sixty families. A similar class in the Gaelic world were the Flatha. In the Middle Ages a bishop sometimes held territory as a magnate, collecting the revenue of the manors and the associated knights' fees.

In the Tudor period, after Henry VII defeated Richard III at Bosworth Field, Henry made a point of executing or neutralising as many magnates as possible. Henry would make parliament attaint undesirable nobles and magnates, thereby stripping them of their wealth, protection from torture, and power. Henry also used the Court of the Star Chamber to have powerful nobles executed. Henry VIII continued this approach in his reign; he inherited a survivalistic mistrust of nobles from his father. Henry VIII ennobled very few men and the ones he did were all "new men": novi homines, greatly indebted to him and having very limited power.

Hungary
The term was specifically applied to the members (equivalent to British Peers) of the Upper House in the Apostolic Kingdom of Hungary, the Főrendiház or House of Magnates.

Poland and Lithuania 

Magnates were a social class of wealthy and influential nobility in the Crown of the Kingdom of Poland and Grand Duchy of Lithuania, and later the Polish–Lithuanian Commonwealth.

Spain 
In Spain, since the late Middle Ages the highest class of nobility hold the appellation of Grandee of Spain.

Sweden 

In Sweden, the wealthiest medieval lords were known as storman (plural stormän), "great men", a similar description and meaning as the English term magnate.

Japan 

In feudal Japan, the most powerful landholding magnates were known as daimyo. In the 11th and 12th centuries, the daimyo became military lords of samurai clans with territorial and proprietary control over private estates.

See also
 Aristocracy
 Boyar, in Eastern Europe
 Magnat (film)
 Szlachta, in Poland

References

Sources
 

Social classes
 
Noble titles
Nobility of the United Kingdom
Hungarian nobility
 
Spanish noble titles
Swedish nobility